The Easter parade is an annual parade in New York and other cities.

Easter Parade may also refer to:

Easter Parade (film), starring Fred Astaire and Judy Garland
"Easter Parade" (song), written by Irving Berlin
The Easter Parade, a novel by Richard Yates
"Easter Parade" (short story), a Nero Wolfe mystery novella by Rex Stout